A ministerial by-election is a by-election to fill a vacancy triggered by the appointment of the sitting member of parliament (MP) as a minister in the cabinet.  The requirement for new ministers to stand for re-election was introduced in the House of Commons of Great Britain in 1707 and also featured in Westminster system parliaments modelled on it. In latter times, the by-election was usually a formality, uncontested by the opposition. In the United Kingdom, ministerial by-elections were abolished as an anachronism in 1926. The Irish Free State, Union of South Africa, and Dominion of New Zealand never had them.

In dualistic parliamentary systems, like those in the Netherlands, Slovakia and Sweden, ministers cannot be sitting MPs at the same time. Therefore, the appointment of a sitting MP as a minister triggers a vacancy in Parliament. If the normal rule for filling vacancies is holding a by-election (rather than a substitute automatically filling the vacancy, for example), a dualistic parliamentary system would thus have ministerial by-elections too.

Westminster

Ministerial by-elections were a feature of the House of Commons of Great Britain, and its successor the House of Commons of the United Kingdom, from 1707 to 1926.  Seventeenth-century English history established the doctrine of parliamentary sovereignty, in particular from interference by the monarch. In 1624, the House of Commons of England resolved that an MP could not resign his seat, and in 1680 it resolved that accepting an office of profit from the Crown would precipitate resignation from the House. Sections 24 and 25 of the Succession to the Crown Act 1707 listed ministerial offices among those considered offices of profit, while mitigating this by allowing the option of standing for re-election. A minister typically sought re-election in the same constituency he had just vacated, but occasionally contested another seat which was also vacant.

As a rule, the requirement to stand in a by-election only applied when an elected legislator was first appointed to a portfolio. Any ministers already holding portfolios were not required to contest additional by-elections to remain ministers after being returned in a subsequent general election (assuming, of course, that their party managed to remain in government). The Reform Act 1867 made cabinet reshuffles easier by abolishing the necessity to seek re-election for an existing minister taking a new portfolio. In 1910 The Times newspaper noted that the relevant Act had been passed in the reign of Queen Anne "to prevent the Court from swamping the House of Commons with placemen and pensioners", and described the process as "anomalous" and "indefensible" in the 20th century. During the First World War, temporary acts in 1915 and 1916 suspended the requirement for re-election, in order to allow the War Cabinets of the Asquith coalition ministry and the Lloyd George ministry to be appointed quickly. The Re-Election of Ministers Act 1919 ended the requirement within nine months of a general election, and the Re-Election of Ministers Act (1919) Amendment Act 1926, introduced by the opposition as a private member's bill, ended the practice in all other cases.

Canada
Ministerial by-elections also occurred in the federal House of Commons of Canada until 1931, and in Canadian provincial assemblies. One controversy within the 1926 King–Byng Affair was prime minister Arthur Meighen's appointment of "acting ministers" to circumvent the need for by-elections. Ministerial by-elections were abolished by the Legislative Assemblies of Alberta in 1926, of Quebec, of New Brunswick, and of Nova Scotia in 1927, of British Columbia in 1929, of Prince Edward Island in 1932, of Saskatchewan in 1936, of Manitoba in 1937, and of Ontario in 1941 (partially in 1926). In addition Newfoundland, at the time a separate Dominion from Canada, abolished Ministerial by-elections in 1928. The North-West Territories also used ministerial by-elections during the period of Responsible Government from 1897–1905.

Australia
Most of the legislatures of the British colonies in Australia required ministerial by-elections, though the federal House of Representatives created in 1901 and the South Australian House of Assembly created in 1857 never did. The requirement was abolished in the Queensland Legislative Assembly in 1884, the Tasmanian House of Assembly in 1901, the New South Wales Legislative Assembly in 1906, the Victorian Legislative Assembly in 1915, and the Western Australian Legislative Assembly in 1947.

Sources

See also
 Dualism (politics)
 Norwegian Law (Israel)

References

 
By-elections
Westminster system
Government ministers